is a Japanese professional baseball pitcher for the Tokyo Yakult Swallows of Nippon Professional Baseball.

Professional career
On October 22, 2015, Kozawa was drafted by the Fukuoka SoftBank Hawks in the 2015 Nippon Professional Baseball draft. In 2016, Kozawa pitched in informal matches against the Shikoku Island League Plus's teams and amateur baseball teams.

On August 24, 2017, Kozawa debuted in the Pacific League against the Saitama Seibu Lions, and pitched two games in the Pacific League. In June 2018, Kozawa hurt his neck and back and spent the season rehabilitating. On November 20, he left the active roster and signed as a developmental player.

In 2019, Kozawa played in the Western League of NPB's minor leagues, and pitched in eight games and recorded an ERA of .193. In 2020, Kozawa played in the Western League, and pitched in six games and recorded an ERA of .5.51. On November 4, Hawks has released him.

Tokyo Yakult Swallows
On December 14, 2020, Tokyo Yakult Swallows has signed with him as a developmental player.

June 26, 2022,  Kozawa re-signed a 6.5 million yen contract with the Tokyo Yakult Swallows as a registered player under control.

References

External links

 NPB.jp
 123 Reiji Kozawa PLAYERS2020 - Fukuoka SoftBank Hawks Official site
 選手名鑑 014 小澤 怜史 - Tokyo Yakult Swallows Official site

1998 births
Living people
Fukuoka SoftBank Hawks players
Tokyo Yakult Swallows players
Japanese baseball players
Nippon Professional Baseball pitchers
Baseball people from Shizuoka Prefecture
Mishima, Shizuoka